Secondary Highway 667, commonly referred to as Highway 667, is a provincially maintained secondary highway located in the Sudbury District of the Canadian province of Ontario. Roughly  in length, the route connects Highway 129 to the town of Sultan and to Wakami Lake Provincial Park. East of the town, the route continues as the Sultan Industrial Road, a privately maintained but publicly accessible logging road, towards Highway 144. Highway 667 was established in 1977 and has remained unchanged since then.

Route description 

Highway 667 begins at Highway 129 near the entrance to Five Mile Lake Provincial Park. It is mostly straight from that point to its eastern terminus at the Sultan Industrial Road, passing clear cut forests along the way. The road which carries Highway 667 continues east into Sultan as a local street.

Like other provincial routes in Ontario, Highway 667 is maintained by the Ministry of Transportation of Ontario. In 2016, traffic surveys conducted by the ministry along the route showed that on average, 180 vehicles used the highway daily.

History 
Highway 667 was established along an existing forest access road in 1977. The route was originally unpaved.
Since then, it has been paved, but otherwise remains unchanged.

Major intersections

References 

667
Roads in Sudbury District